Star Castle is a vector graphics multidirectional shooter released in arcades  by Cinematronics in 1980. The game involves obliterating a series of defenses orbiting a stationary turret in the center of the screen. The display is black and white with the colors of the rings and screen provided by a transparent plastic screen overlay.

Star Castle was designed by Tim Skelly and programmed by Scott Boden. Skelly created a number of other Cinematronics vector games, including Starhawk, Armor Attack, and Rip-Off. A Vectrex port of Star Castle for was released in 1983.

Gameplay

The object of Star Castle is to destroy an enemy cannon which sits in the center of three concentric, rotating energy shield rings while avoiding or destroying "mines"–enemies that spawn from the core, pass through the energy rings, and then home in on the player's ship. The player-controlled spaceship can rotate, thrust forward, and fire small projectiles. The cannon's shields are composed of twelve sections each, and each section takes two hits to destroy. Once a section is breached, rings beneath it are exposed to fire.

Once the innermost ring has been breached, the central weapon is vulnerable to attack from the player. However, the player is also more vulnerable at this point, as with the shield rings eliminated, the gun can fire out a large projectile that hisses with white noise. Moreover, the central core tracks player movement at all times. If the player manages to hit the cannon, it explodes violently, collapsing the remnants of the shield rings, and the player is awarded with an extra ship. The next level then starts with a new gun and fully restored shield rings, with the difficulty increased (the mines move faster, the rings rotate more quickly, and the core tracks the player faster).

If the player completely destroys the outermost shield ring, the cannon will create a new one. The middle ring expands to replace the lost outer ring, the inner ring replaces the middle, and a new ring emerges from the core to become the inner ring. Therefore, in order to penetrate the cannon's defenses, the player must be careful not to completely obliterate the outer ring.

The three homing mines will destroy the player's ship on contact. The mines can be destroyed, but they are very small and difficult to fire on, and the player does not receive points for destroying them. Mines are revived when shield rings regenerate (some variants keep three mines churning constantly so that a new mine respawns from the core as soon as one is destroyed). As the player progresses through the levels, the mines get faster and faster, forcing the player to keep moving to avoid them.

Reception 
In 1995, Flux magazine ranked Star Castle 83rd on their Top 100 Video Games, calling it "One of the all-time great vector graphics classics".

Legacy
In an interview, Skelly admitted that the stellar field was made using the shape of a woman from a nude magazine

Atari, Inc. programmer Howard Scott Warshaw investigated writing a clone of Star Castle for the Atari 2600, but didn't see the game as a good match for the system, technically. He reconfigured the concept into Yars' Revenge, which became Atari's top selling original game for the 2600. A hobbyist-written clone of Star Castle for the Atari 2600 was eventually released in 2012.

Jim Nitchals of Cavalier Computer wrote a clone for the Apple II called Ring Raiders (referenced in-game as Raiders of the Lost Ring) (1981). Anthony Weber of Stedek Software wrote a clone for the Atari 8-bit family called Star Island (1982).

References

External links
 

1980 video games
Arcade video games
Cinematronics games
Multidirectional shooters
Vector arcade video games
Vectrex games
Video games developed in the United States